Klokketind or Klokktinden is a mountain in Nordland county, Norway. The mountain was first ascended in 1910 by Alf Bonnevie Bryn and Ferdinand Schjelderup.

References

Mountains of Nordland
Moskenes
Flakstad